General of Brigade Victor Gabriel Levasseur, 1st Baron Levasseur (7 March 1772 in Caen – 13 September 1811 in Valognes) commanded a French infantry brigade in the Grande Armée of Emperor Napoleon I. Leaving civilian life, he enlisted in a volunteer battalion in 1792 and was wounded at the 1793 Siege of Mainz. In the Rhine Campaign of 1796 he fought at Rastatt and Kehl. Promoted general of brigade in 1800, he fought at Hohenlinden. Under Napoleon he commanded a brigade in the IV Corps at Austerlitz in 1805, Battle of Jena in 1806 and Eylau in 1807, where he was wounded. He became a Baron of the Empire in 1808, commanded posts in the interior and served as a military instructor. He died in 1811 at Valognes.

Career
On 16 May 1800, Levasseur was made General (Brigadier) of the 2nd brigade of the 4th Corps of the Grand Army (Commanded by Marshal Soult).

Levasseur distinguished himself in battle at Iéna and his brigade participated in the encirclement and the decisive breakthrough at Austerlitz which saw the battle turn in Napoleon's favour.

Levasseur was wounded at the Battle of Eylau in 1807 and was made a Chevalier de la Légion d'honneur.

Generals of the First French Empire
1772 births
1809 deaths
Chevaliers of the Légion d'honneur
French military personnel of the French Revolutionary Wars
French military personnel of the Napoleonic Wars
Military personnel from Caen